Justice Day refers to William R. Day, associate justice of the Supreme Court of the United States. Justice Day may also refer to:

Arthur H. Day, associate justice of the Ohio Supreme Court
George A. Day, associate justice of the Nebraska Supreme Court
James G. Day, associate justice of the Iowa Supreme Court
L. B. Day (judge), associate justice of the Nebraska Supreme Court
Luther Day, associate justice of the Ohio Supreme Court
Robert H. Day (judge), associate justice of the Ohio Supreme Court
Roland B. Day, chief justice of the Wisconsin Supreme Court

See also
World Day of Social Justice
World Day for International Justice